Our Thing may refer to:

 Cosa Nostra (literally Our Thing), an organized crime group
 American Mafia, also sometimes known as "Our Thing", an organized crime group
 Our Thing (album), an album by Joe Henderson
 "Our Thing", a song by Elliott Smith, a non-album track from XO
 UnserDing (Our Thing), a radio program produced by German broadcaster Saarländischer Rundfunk

See also
 Thang (disambiguation)
 Thing (disambiguation)
 The Things (disambiguation)
 Thring, a surname
 Thwing (disambiguation)